After winning the Second Division title the previous season, West Ham equalled their highest ever league finish of the 1926–1927 season, coming a very respectable 6th.  This was in spite of the fact that the only signing they made was of the Leyton Orient Inside Forward Phil Woosnam in November 1958.

Season summary
West Ham beat the champions of that season (and the previous one) Wolves 2-0 in their first home match back in the top flight.

The team featured Andy Malcolm who was West Ham's first ever England Youth International.  This indicated the progress Manager Ted Fenton had made in establishing West Ham's successful Academy.

1958-59
English football clubs 1958–59 season
1958 sports events in London
1959 sports events in London